The North Korea women's national under-20 football team represents the Democratic People's Republic of Korea in international association football competitions in the FIFA U-20 Women's World Cup and the AFC U-19 Women's Championship, as well as any other under-20 women's international football tournaments. It is governed by the DPR Korea Football Association.

They have won the FIFA U-20 Women's World Cup twice, in 2006 and 2016. Upon the former triumph, they became the first Asian team to win a FIFA women's tournament and the first Asian football team to win any FIFA tournaments since Saudi Arabia's victory in the 1989 FIFA U-16 World Championship.

Competition History

FIFA U-20 Women's World Cup

AFC U-19 Women's Championship 

*Draws include knockout matches decided on penalty kicks.

Current squad
U-20 Women's national team for 2016 FIFA U-20 Women's World Cup from November 13 to December 3.

See also

North Korea women's national football team
North Korea women's national under-17 football team

References

External links 
North Korea at the FIFA website
North Korea at the AFC website

Asian women's national under-20 association football teams
under